William Kissam "Willie" Vanderbilt I (December 12, 1849 – July 22, 1920) was an American heir, businessman, philanthropist and horsebreeder. Born into the Vanderbilt family, he managed his family's railroad investments.

Early life
William Kissam Vanderbilt I was born on December 12, 1849, in New Dorp, Staten Island in New York. His parents were Maria Louisa Kissam (1821–1896) and William Henry Vanderbilt (1821–1885), the eldest son of Commodore Cornelius Vanderbilt, an heir to his fortune and a prominent member of the Vanderbilt family who was the richest American after he took over his father's fortune in 1877 until his own death in 1885.

He was the third of eight children born to his parents.  His siblings were Cornelius Vanderbilt II (1843–1899), Margaret Louisa Vanderbilt (1845–1924), Emily Thorn Vanderbilt (1852–1946), Florence Adele Vanderbilt (1854–1952), Frederick William Vanderbilt (1856–1938), Eliza Osgood Vanderbilt (1860–1936) and George Washington Vanderbilt II (1862–1914).

Career
Vanderbilt inherited $55 million (equal to about $ billion today) from his father. He managed his family railroad investments. In 1879, after taking over P. T. Barnum's Great Roman Hippodrome which was on railroad property by Madison Square Park, he renamed the facility Madison Square Garden.

Thoroughbred horse racing
Vanderbilt was one of the founders of The Jockey Club. He was a shareholder and president of the Sheepshead Bay Race Track in Brooklyn, New York and the owner of a successful racing stable. In 1896, he built the American Horse Exchange at 50th Street (Manhattan) and Broadway.  In 1911 he leased it (and eventually sold it to) the Shubert Organization who then transformed it into the Winter Garden Theatre.

After his divorce from Alva, he moved to France where he built a château and established the Haras du Quesnay horse racing stable and breeding farm near Deauville in France's famous horse region of Lower Normandy. Among the horses he owned was the U.S. Racing Hall of Fame filly Maskette, purchased from Castleton Farm in Lexington, Kentucky for broodmare services at his French breeding farm.
Vanderbilt's horses won a number of important races in France including:
 Critérium de Maisons-Laffitte: Prestige (1905), Northeast (1907),  Montrose II (1911)
 Critérium de Saint-Cloud: Illinois II (1901), Marigold (1902)
 Grand Critérium: Prestige (1905), Montrose II (1911)
 Grand Prix de Deauville: Turenne (1904), Maintenon (1906)
 Grand Prix de Paris: Northeast (1908), Brumelli (1917)
 Grand Prix de Saint-Cloud: Maintenon (1906), Sea Sick (1908), Oversight (1910)
 Poule d'Essai des Poulains: McKinley (1919)
 Prix de Guiche: Negofol (1909), McKinley (1919)
 Prix de la Forêt: Prestige (1905), Montrose II (1911, dead-heat), Pétulance (1911, dead-heat)
 Prix du Jockey Club: Maintenon (1906), Sea Sick (1908), Negofol (1909), Tchad (1919)
 Prix Eugène Adam: Alpha (1903), Maintenon (1906)
 Prix Boiard: Prestige (1906), Maintenon (1907) et Tchad (1920)
 Prix Jean Prat: Prestige (1906)
 Prix Kergorlay: Turenne (1904), Maintenon (1906), Sea Sick (1909, 1910)
 Prix Lagrange: Prestige (1906)
 Prix Morny: Prestige (1905), Messidor III (1909) et Manfred (1910)
 Prix Robert Papin: Prestige (1905), Montrose II (1911), Gloster (1912)
 Prix La Rochette: Schuyler (1907), Manfred (1910), Brume (1910), Pétulance (1911)
 Prix Royal-Oak: Maintenon (1906), Reinhart (1910)

Personal life

On April 20, 1875, Vanderbilt married his first wife, Alva Erskine Smith (1853–1933), who was born in 1853 in Mobile, Alabama, to Murray Forbes Smith, a commission merchant, and Phoebe Ann Desha, daughter of US Representative Robert Desha. Together, they had three children:

 Consuelo Vanderbilt (born March 2, 1877)
 William Kissam Vanderbilt II (born on October 26, 1878)
 Harold Stirling Vanderbilt (born on July 6, 1884)

Alva later coerced Consuelo into marrying Charles Spencer-Churchill, 9th Duke of Marlborough on November 6, 1895.  Alva divorced Vanderbilt in March 1895, at a time when divorce was rare among the elite, and received a large financial settlement reported to be in excess of $10 million (equal to about $ million today).  The grounds for divorce were allegations of Vanderbilt's adultery. Indeed, one account of cheating on his wife was with none other than the Duchess of Manchester, Consuelo Yznaga, also known as his wife’s best friend. Alva remarried to one of their old family friends, Oliver Hazard Perry Belmont, on January 11, 1896.

In 1903, Vanderbilt married Anne Harriman (1861–1940), daughter of banker Oliver Harriman.  She was a widow to sportsman Samuel Stevens Sands and to Lewis Morris Rutherfurd, Jr., son of the astronomer Lewis Morris Rutherfurd. Her second husband had died in Switzerland in 1901. She had two sons by her first marriage and two daughters by her second marriage. She had no children by Vanderbilt.

Residences

Like other prominent Vanderbilts, he built magnificent houses. His residences included Idle Hour (1900) on Long Island and Marble House (1892), designed by Richard Morris Hunt, in Newport, Rhode Island. Hunt also designed Vanderbilt's 660 Fifth Avenue mansion (1883).

In 1907, Vanderbilt and his second wife built Château Vanderbilt, a Louis XIII style manor house along with three thoroughbred race tracks in Carrières-sous-Poissy, an hour outside Paris and on the route to Deauville, famous for its horse racing.

Vanderbilt was a co-owner of the yacht Defender, which won the 1895 America's Cup and briefly owned the large steam yacht Consuelo. Vanderbilt was a founder and president of the New Theatre. 

Vanderbilt made significant charitable contributions to Vanderbilt University, a private university in Nashville, Tennessee named for his grandfather.

Death and legacy
Vanderbilt died in Paris, France, on July 22, 1920. His remains were brought home and interred in the Vanderbilt family mausoleum in New Dorp, Staten Island, New York.

Vanderbilt's portrait, painted by F. W. Wright from an original painting by Richard Hall between 1911 and 1921, was donated to Vanderbilt University in 1921; it is hung in Kirkland Hall.

Founding member of the Jekyll Island Club aka The Millionaires Club on Jekyll Island, Georgia.

References

Further reading
Case, Carole -  The Right Blood: America's Aristocrats in Thoroughbred Racing (2000) Rutgers University Press

External links 
 

1849 births
1920 deaths
American railroad executives
American railway entrepreneurs
American racehorse owners and breeders
French racehorse owners and breeders
William Kissam
American people of Dutch descent
Businesspeople from Newport, Rhode Island
Vanderbilt University people
Former yacht owners of New York City
People from Midtown Manhattan
Burials at the Vanderbilt Family Cemetery and Mausoleum